This is a list of commercial banks in Guinea

 UBA Guinée (UBA)
 Access Bank Guinée 
First Bank of Nigeria - Formerly International Commercial Bank (ICB)
 Banque Islamique de Guinée (BIG)
 VIstaGui Bank (VGB) (formerly BICIGUI)
 Banque Internationale pour le Commerce et l’Industrie de Guinée  (BICIGUI) 
 Société générale de banques en Guinée  (SGBG) 
 Banque Populaire Maroco-Guinéenne (BPMG)
 Ecobank Guinée (EBG)
 Skye Bank Guinée (SBG)
 Banque Sahélo-Saharienne pour l'Investissement et le Commerce (BSIC)
 Banque Africaine de Development Agricole et Minier (BADAM)
 Orabank Guinée (ORANBANK)
 NSIA Banque Guinée  (NSIA Banque)
 Banque pour le Commerce et l'Industrie Guinée  (BCI)
 FIBank Guinée (FIBANK)
 Banque de Developpement de Guinée (BDG)
18.   Société de Financement du Commerce et de  l’Industrie  (SFCI BANK)

See also
 List of banks in Africa
 Central Bank of Guinea
 Economy of Guinea
 List of companies based in Guinea

References

External links
 Website of Banque Centrale de la Republique de Guinee (French)

 
Banks
Guinea
Guinea